Re_Mixed (also known as Hybrid Remixed) is a two disc compilation album released in 2007, featuring remixes of songs by Hybrid. It was released with Distinctive Records on 22 October 2007.

Hybrid had nothing to do with the compilation's release, as it was meant to be their final release on Distinct'ive Records. However, despite being managed by Hope Recordings, Hybrid still released their next few releases on Distinctive.

Track list

Promo Version
A promotional version of Hybrid Remixed was released a couple of weeks before the official release. The promo version includes a different track list, including 17 tracks, over 2 discs. It includes a longer version of Cascade (featured on Scores), a different version of Future Funk Squad's remix of "Sleepwalking" and an extra remix of "Finished Symphony" and an instrumental version of Jerome Sydenham's remix of "If I Survive". The tracks are encoded in 128 kbit/s. The sleeve says the tracks are faded, but they aren't; all of the tracks are in their full lengths.

Track list

Disc 1
 Hybrid Feat. John Graham - "Until Tomorrow (Stefan Anion & Starfire's 'Surviving Another Day Mix)" - 9:29
 Hybrid Feat. Kirsty Hawkshaw - "Just For Today (Jerome Sydenham Remix)" - 7:46
 Hybrid Feat. Judie Tzuke - "Falling Down (Kosheen DJs Mix)" - 8:24
 Hybrid - "Finished Symphony (Deadmau5 Mix)" - 6:46
 Hybrid Feat. Julee Cruise - "If I Survive (Jerome Sydenham Vocal Dub)" - 7:17
 Hybrid - "Keep It In The Family (Tomas Barford Mix)" - 6:55
 Hybrid - "Finished Symphony (Deadset Play Nifty Mix)" - 7:29
 Hybrid - "Cascade" - 6:23
 Hybrid Feat. Kirsty Hawkshaw -"Blackout (The Cinematic Orchestra Mix)" - 7:48

Disc 2
 Hybrid - "Last Man Standing (Group Therapy Remix)" - 8:19
 Hybrid - "Sleepwalking (Future Funk Squad Remix)" - 5:54
 Hybrid Feat. Kirsty Hawkshaw - "Just For Today (Jerome Sydenham Dub Mix)" - 6:26
 Hybrid Feat. John Graham - "Until Tomorrow (Serge Santiago Remix)" - 9:06
 Hybrid - "I Choose Noise (Elite Force Remix)" - 7:37
 Hybrid Feat. Peter Hook - "Higher Than A Skyscraper (Boy 8-Bit Remix)" - 5:10
 Hybrid Feat. Julee Cruise - "If I Survive (Jerome Sydenham Dubstrumental)" - 7:17
 Hybrid - "Finished Symphony (Deadset Dubtool Mix)" - 6:07

Trivia
 In the writing credits for "Keep It In the Family (Tomboys Quirky Piano-Intro Version)" Harry Gregson-Williams is wrongly named as Gregson and Williams.
 Apparently, the track listing on iTunes is different from the CD. In the iTunes version (as well as the Amazon mp3 download version), "I Know (Keenan and Anderson Mix)" is excluded (for a total of 8 tracks on disc 1) and "Just For Today (Jerome Sydenham Dub)" is included instead (as the 8th and final track on disc 2). Also, on the Amazon mp3 download version, all tracks are listed as being on a single disc.
 "Sleepwalking (Hybrid's Original Mix)" is shorter than the version featured in DJ sets.

Hybrid (British band) albums
2007 remix albums
Articles with underscores in the title